Torger Juve (born October 23, 1840) was a member of the Wisconsin State Assembly.

Biography
Torger O. Juve was born in Christiansands Stift (now Telemark), Norway.  
He immigrated to the United States with his family during 1852. He first resided at Koshkonong, Wisconsin, until 1857. He graduated from Luther College in 1866 and from Concordia College in 1869 and become a Lutheran clergyman.

Political career
Juve was elected to the Assembly as a Republican legislator from Vernon County, Wisconsin, in 1881 and was re-elected in 1882.

References

Norwegian emigrants to the United States
People from Telemark
People from Vernon County, Wisconsin
Republican Party members of the Wisconsin State Assembly
19th-century American Lutheran clergy
Luther College (Iowa) alumni
Concordia Seminary alumni
1840 births
Year of death missing
People from Koshkonong, Wisconsin